The 50th Annual GMA Dove Awards presentation ceremony was held on Tuesday, October 15, 2019, at the Allen Arena in Nashville, Tennessee. The ceremony recognized the accomplishments of musicians and other figures within the Christian music industry for the year 2019. The awards show aired on the Trinity Broadcasting Network on Sunday, October 20, 2019, at 8 p.m. ET.

The nominations were announced on August 14, 2019, with producer and songwriter Wayne Haun receiving the most nominations with ten, whilst Lauren Daigle led the artist nominations with six. The big winners of the night were producer and songwriter Jason Ingram with four awards and Lauren Daigle, who received three awards.

Nominations announcement 
The nominations were announced on August 14, 2019, by Natalie Grant, Jekalyn Carr and Karen Peck through a live stream on the GMA Dove Awards' Facebook page.

Performers 
The following musical artists performed at the 50th GMA Dove Awards:
 Josh Baldwin
 Shirley Caesar
 Jekalyn Carr
 Casting Crowns
 Steven Curtis Chapman
 Riley Clemmons
 Aaron Cole
 Dorinda Clark Cole
 Michael English
 Kirk Franklin
 Austin French
 Gaither Vocal Band
 Kelontae Gavin
 Gawvi
 Amy Grant
 Joseph Habedank
 Hillsong Worship
 Brian Johnson and the Bethel Music band
 Lecrae
 Ledger
 Mark Lowry
 Matt Maher
 Jonathan McReynolds
 MercyMe
 Bart Millard
 Karen Peck and New River
 David Phelps
 Michael W. Smith
 Russ Taff
 Tedashii
 TobyMac
 Triumphant Quartet
 Matthew West
 Phil Wickham
 CeCe Winans

Presenters 
The following served as presenters at the 50th GMA Dove Awards:
 Brown Bannister
 Pat Barrett
 Francesca Battistelli
 Blanca
 Pat Boone
 Anthony Brown
 Shirley Caesar
 Jeremy Camp
 Evan Craft
 John Crist
 Lauren Daigle
 For King & Country
 Gloria Gaither
 Kathy Lee Gifford
 Danny Gokey
 Natalie Grant
 Koryn Hawthorne
 Pastor Brian Houston
 Kari Jobe
 Dr. Bobby Jones
 Donald Lawrence
 Tasha Cobbs Leonard
 William McDowell
 Don Moen
 Nicole C. Mullen
 Chonda Pierce
 Point of Grace
 Josh Turner
 Tauren Wells
 Zach Williams

Nominees and winners 
This is a complete list of the nominees for the 50th GMA Dove Awards. Winners are in bold.

General 

Song of the Year
"Counting Every Blessing" 
(writers) Chris Llewellyn, Gareth Gilkeson, (publishers) Capitol CMG Paragon, Rend Family Music
"Everything"
(writers) David Garcia, Toby McKeehan, (publishers) Achtober Songs, D Soul Music, Universal Music - Brentwood Benson Publishing
"Joy." 
(writers) Ben Glover, Joel Smallbone, Luke Smallbone, Matt Hales, Seth Mosley, Stephen Blake Kanicka, Tedd Tjornhom, (publishers) 9t One Songs, Ariose Music, CentricSongs, Curb Wordspring Music LLC, Fleauxmotion Music, Kilns Music, Method to the Madness, Shankel Songs, Shaun Shankel Pub Designee, Stephen Blake Kanicka Publishing, These Tunes Go To 11, Warner-Tamerlane Publishing Corp.
"Known" 
(writers) Ethan Hulse, Jordan Sapp, Tauren Wells, (publishers) Be Essential Songs, Capitol CMG Paragon, Crucial Music Entertainment, EGH Music Publishing
"Living Hope" 
(writers) Brian Johnson, Phil Wickham, (publishers) Bethel Music Publishing, Phil Wickham Music, Simply Global Songs, Sing My Songs
"Only Jesus" 
(writers) Bernie Herms, Mark Hall, Matthew West, (publishers) Be Essential Songs, Highly Combustible Music, House of Story Music Publishing, My Refuge Music, One77 Songs
"Red Letters" 
(writers) David Crowder, Ed Cash, (publishers) Alletrop Music, Inot Music, sixsteps Music, worshiptogether.com songs
"The Breakup Song" 
(writers) Bart Millard, David Garcia, Francesca Battistelli, (publishers) Bartatronic Millaphonic, D Soul Music, Francesca Music, Tunes of MercyMe, Universal Music - Brentwood Benson Publishing, Word Music LLC
"Who You Say I Am" 
(writers) Ben Fielding, Reuben Morgan, (publisher) Hillsong Music Publishing
"Won't He Do It" 
(writers) Loren Hill, Makeba Riddick-Woods, Rich Shelton, (publishers) SONGSBYMAK, Janice Combs Publishing, EMI Blackwood Music Inc., Nieze World Music, One Dynasty Music
"You Say" 
(writers) Jason Ingram, Paul Mabury, Lauren Daigle, (publishers) CentricSongs, Fellow Ships Music, Flychild Publishing, So Essential Tunes

Worship Song of the Year
"Build My Life"
(writers) Brett Younker, Karl Martin, Kirby Kaple, Matt Redman, Pat Barrett, (publishers) Bethel Music Publishing, Capitol CMG Genesis, Housefires Sounds, Kaple Music, Martin Karl Andrew, Said And Done Music, sixsteps Music Thankyou Music worshiptogether.com songs
"Living Hope"
(writers) Brian Johnson, Phil Wickham, (publishers) Bethel Music Publishing, Phil Wickham Music, Simply Global Songs, Sing My Songs
"Surrounded (Fight My Battles)"
(writer) Elyssa Smith, (publisher) UR Global Publishing
"Who You Say I Am"
(writers) Ben Fielding, Reuben Morgan, (publisher) Hillsong Music Publishing
"Yes I Will"
(writers) Eddie Hoagland, Jonathan Smith, Mia Fieldes, (publishers) All Essential Music, Be Essential Songs, HBC Worship Music, Hickory Bill Doc, Jingram Music Publishing, So Essential Tunes, Upside Down Under

Songwriter of the Year
Bart Millard
Brian Johnson
Lauren Daigle
Mark Hall
Luke Smallbone and Joel Smallbone (Team)

Songwriter of the Year (Non-artist)
Ben Glover
David Garcia
Ethan Hulse
Jason Ingram
Paul Mabury

Contemporary Christian Artist of the Year
Hillsong UNITED, Hillsong Music / Capitol CMG
Lauren Daigle, Centricity
Tauren Wells, Provident Music Group
TobyMac, Forefront / Capitol CMG
Zach Williams, Provident Label Group

Southern Gospel Artist of the Year
Ernie Haase & Signature Sound, Stowtown
Gaither Vocal Band, Gaither Music Group
Jason Crabb, Daywind Records
Joseph Habedank, Daywind Records
Karen Peck & New River, Daywind Records

Gospel Artist of the Year
Jekalyn Carr, Lunjeal Music Group
Kirk Franklin, Fo Yo Soul Recordings / RCA Records
Koryn Hawthorne, RCA Inspiration
Tasha Cobbs Leonard, Motown Gospel
Travis Greene, RCA Inspiration

Artist of the Year
For King & Country, Curb / Word Entertainment
Hillsong United, Hillsong Music / Capital CMG
Lauren Daigle, Centricity
MercyMe, Fair Trade
TobyMac, ForeFront / Capitol CMG

New Artist of the Year
Aaron Cole, Gotee Records
Austin French, Fair Trade
Josh Baldwin, Bethel Music
Kelontae Gavin, MBE / Tyscot
Riley Clemmons, Sparrow Records / Capitol CMG

Producer of the Year
Chris Mackey
Dana Sorey
Ed Cash
Wayne Haun
Jason Ingram and Paul Mabury (Team)
Matt Hales, Seth Mosley, and Tedd T. (Team)

Rap/Hip Hop 

Rap/Hip Hop Recorded Song of the Year
"None of My Business" – Andy Mineo
(writer) Andy Mineo
"Fight for Me" – GAWVI
(writers) Gabriel Azucena, J. Raul Garcia, Matt Cohen, Lecrae Moore
"Get Back Right" – Lecrae & Zaytoven
(writers) Bobby Pressley, Che Olson, Lecrae Moore, Xavier Dotson
"Everytime" – Social Club Misfits
(writers) Daniel Young Kim, Fernando Miranda, Martin Santiago
"Even Louder (featuring Natalie Grant)" – Steven Malcolm
(writers) Benji Cowart, Jonathan Jay, Joseph Prielozny, Kenneth Mackey, Leeland Mooring, Matt Armstrong, Steven Malcolm, Tony Brown, William Reeves

Rap/Hip Hop Album of the Year
II: The Sword – Andy Mineo
(producers) Andy Mineo, Chad Gardner, Daniel Steele, Dave James, Lasanna "Ace" Harris, GSP, Vikaden
Panorama – GAWVI
(producers) Enzo Gran, Epikh Pro, GAWVI, Jonatan Barahona, Justin Barahona, Lasanna "Ace" Harris, Matt Cohen
Let the Trap Say Amen – Lecrae & Zaytoven(producer) ZaytovenThe Second City – Steven Malcolm
(producers) Chris "Dirty Rice" Mackey, Joseph Prielozny, JuiceBangers
Never Fold – Tedashii
(producers) Chris Howland, Chris King, Daramola, Derek Minor, Desmond South, Evan Ford, Gavin George, Iggy Music, Jacob Cardec, Jimi Cravity, Jordan Sapp, Lasanna "ACE"  Harris, Mashell Leroy, Sean Hamilton, Sean Minor, Shama "Sak Pase" Joseph, Steve "Pompano Puff" Tirogene, Tedashii Anderson, Tee Wyla, Zach Paradis

 Rock/Contemporary Rock/Contemporary Recorded Song of the Year"Wildfire" – Crowder(writers) David Crowder, Rebecca Lauren Olds, Solomon Olds"Forever On Your Side (featuring JOHNNYSWIM)" – NEEDTOBREATHE
(writers) Bo Rinehart, Bear Rinehart
"Native Tongue" – Switchfoot
(writers) Brent Kutzle, Jon Foreman, Tim ForemanRock/Contemporary Album of the YearPeace – Demon Hunter
(producer) Jeremiah Scott
Acoustic Live Vol 1 – NEEDTOBREATHE
(producers) Bo Rinehart, Bear RinehartNative Tongue – Switchfoot(producers) Brent Kutzle, Jon Foreman, Tim Foreman, Tyler Chester, Tyler Spry Pop/Contemporary Pop/Contemporary Recorded Song of the Year"Only Jesus" – Casting Crowns
(writers) Bernie Herms, Mark Hall, Matthew West"God Only Knows" – For King & Country(writers) Joel Smallbone, Jordan Reynolds, Josh Kerr, Luke Smallbone, Tedd Tjornhom"The Breakup Song" – Francesca Battisteli
(writers) Bart Millard, David Garcia, Francesca Battistelli
"You Say" – Lauren Daigle
(writers) Jason Ingram, Lauren Daigle, Paul Mabury
"Known" – Tauren Wells
(writers) Ethan Hulse, Jordan Sapp, Tauren WellsPop/Contemporary Album of the YearOnly Jesus – Casting Crowns
(producer) Mark A. Miller
I Know a Ghost – Crowder
(producers) Brendon Coe, David Crowder, Ed Cash, Hank Bentley, Solomon Olds, Tommee Profitt
Burn the Ships – For King & Country
(producers) Joel Smallbone, Luke Smallbone, Matt Hales, Seth Mosley, Tedd TjornhomLook Up Child – Lauren Daigle
(producers) Jason Ingram, Paul MaburyThe Elements – TobyMac
(producers) Bryan Fowler, Cole Walowac, Dave Lubben, David Garcia, Micah Kuiper, Tim Myers, Toby McKeehan, Tommee Profitt

 Inspirational 

Inspirational Recorded Song of the Year
"Is He Worthy?" – Andrew Peterson
(writers) Andrew Peterson, Ben Shive
"Fall on Your Knees (featuring Charlotte Ritchie)" – David Phelps
(writer) David Phelps
"The God Who Sees" – Nicole C. Mullen, Kathie Lee Gifford
(writers) Kathie Lee Gifford, Nicole C. Mullen
"Glory to Glory" – Riley Harrison Clark
(writers) Jeff Bumgardner, Joel Lindsey, Riley Harrison Clark
"When The Healing Comes" – TaRanda Greene
(writers) Geron Davis, Joel Lindsey, TaRanda Beene, Wayne Haun

Inspirational Album of the YearThe North Coast Sessions – Keith & Kristyn Getty(producers) Fionán de Barra, Keith Getty, Kristyn GettyFollow – Mark Schultz
(producer) Chris Bevins, Tedd T
The Healing – TaRanda Greene
(producers) Carol Cymbala, Bradley Knight, Jason Webb, Jim Hammerly, Keith Everette Smith, Taranda Beene, Virgil Straford, Wayne Haun

 Southern Gospel Southern Gospel Recorded Song of the Year"Longing For Home" – Ernie Haase & Signature Sound
(writers) Ernie Haase, Joel Lindsey, Wayne Haun
"We Are All God's Children" – Gaither Vocal Band
(writers) Benjamin Gaither, Sara Beth Terry, Todd Suttles
"How Great Thou Art (featuring Sonya Isaacs)" – Josh Turner
(writer) Stuart K. Hine"I Know I'll Be There" – Karen Peck & New River(writers) Dave Clark, Karen Peck Gooch, Wayne Haun"Even Me" – Triumphant Quartet
(writers) Jason Cox, Jeff Bumgardner, Kenna Turner WestSouthern Gospel Album of the YearMercy & Love – Collingsworth Family
(producers) David Clydesdale, Wayne Haun
Life Is A Song – Greater Vision
(producer) Gerald Wolfe
Ready For Revival – Guardians
(producers) John Daril Rowsey, Wayne Haun
Deeper Oceans – Joseph Habedank
(producer) Wayne HaunYes – Triumphant Quartet(producers) Gordon Mote, Wayne Haun Bluegrass/Country/Roots Bluegrass/Country/Roots Recorded Song of the Year"Beside The Cross" – Lizzy Long, Rhonda Vincent, & Sally Berry
(writers) Fanny Crosby, Jeff Bumgardner, Joel Lindsey, Wayne Haun
"Wayfaring Stranger" – Jeff & Sheri Easter
(writer) Traditional
"Shame On Me" – Joseph Habedank
(writers) Jason Cox, Joseph Habedank, Michael Boggs"I Saw the Light (featuring Sonya Isaacs)" – Josh Turner(writer) Hank Williams Sr."Dive (featuring Ricky Skaggs)" – Steven Curtis Chapman
(writer) Steven Curtis ChapmanBluegrass/Country/Roots Album of the YearI Serve a Savior – Josh Turner
(producer) Kenny GreenbergDeeper Roots: Where the Bluegrass Grows – Steven Curtis Chapman(producers) Brent Milligan, Steven Curtis ChapmanFavorites: Revisited by Request – The Isaacs
(producers) Ben Isaacs, The Isaacs

 Contemporary Gospel/Urban Contemporary Gospel/Urban Recorded Song of the Year"Blessings On Blessings" – Anthony Brown & Group therAPy
(writer) Anthony Brown
"Make Room" – Jonathan McReynolds
(writer) Jonathan McReynolds"Love Theory" – Kirk Franklin(writer) Kirk Franklin"Unstoppable" – Koryn Hawthorne
(writers) Kid Class, Makeba Riddick, Robert D. Reese
"My God (featuring Mr. Talkbox)" – Nashville Life Music
(writer) Dwan HillContemporary Gospel/Urban Album of the YearRoad to DeMaskUs – Israel Houghton
(producers) Israel Houghton, Matt Edwards
The Answer – Jason Nelson
(producers) Aaron Nelson, Dana Sorey, Eric Dawkins, Jason Nelson, Jonathan Nelson, Kenny Shelton
Declarations – Jonathan Nelson
(producers) Kenneth Shelton, Jonathan NelsonUnstoppable – Koryn Hawthorne(producers) Bernie Herms, Joaquin Bynum, Johnta Austin, Kc Knight, Kid Class, Makeba Riddick-Woods, One Up Entertainment, Robert Reese, Troy Taylor, Vaughan Phoenix, Warryn Campbell, Xeryus Gittens 
Hiding Place – Tori Kelly
(producers) Kirk Franklin, Max Stark, Rickey "Slikk Musik" Offord, Ronald Hill, Scooter Braun, Tori Kelly

 Traditional Gospel Traditional Gospel Recorded Song of the Year"Deliver Me (This is My Exodus) (featuring Le'Andria Johnson)" – Donald Lawrence, The Tri-City Singers(writers) Desmond Davis, Donald Lawrence, Marshon Lewis, Robert Woolridge Jr., William James Stokes"I See Miracles" – Jekalyn Carr
(writer) Allen Carr
"I Made It Out" – John P. Kee
(writer) John P. Kee
"I'm All In" – Maranda Curtis
(writers) Asaph Ward, Dana Sorey, Maranda Curtis
"Kind God" – Marvin Sapp
(writer) Kirk FranklinTraditional Gospel Album of the YearJesus Love Legacy – Bishop Leonard Scott
(producers) Phillip Feaster, Tiffany McGhee
Open Your Mouth and Say Something – Brent Jones
(producers) Brent Jones, Eddie Brown, Professor James RobersonGoshen – Donald Lawrence, The Tri-City Singers(producers) Donald Lawrence, Sir The Baptist, Troy TaylorThis Song Is For You – Earl Bynum
(producer) Earl Bynum
Stand There – The Wardlaw Brothers
(producer) Martin Luther Wardlaw

 Gospel Worship Gospel Worship Recorded Song of the Year"If God / Nothing But the Blood" – Casey J
(writers) Casey J, Natalie Sims, Jon Webb Jr.
"My Worship" – Phil Thompson
(writers) Phil Thompson, Zenzo Matoga"This Is A Move (Live)" – Tasha Cobbs Leonard(writers) Brandon Lake, Nate Moore, Tasha Cobbs Leonard, Tony Brown"You're Doing It All Again" – Todd Dulaney
(writers) Nicole Harris, Todd Dulaney
"Settle Here (Part 1)" – William Murphy
(writer) William MurphyGospel Worship Album of the YearHeart. Passion. Pursuit. (Live) – Tasha Cobbs Leonard(producers) Kenneth Leonard Jr., Monica CoatesTo Africa With Love – Todd Dulaney
(producer) Todd Dulaney
Settle Here – William Murphy
(producers) Kenneth Leonard, Tasha Cobbs Leonard

 Spanish Spanish Language Recorded Song of the Year"Mi GPS" – Alex Zurdo
(writer) Alexis "Alex Zurdo" Velez
"Dios De Maravillas" – Christine D'Clario
(writer) Edward Rivera, Jose Olide, Paul Pineda
"Mi Casa Es Tu Casa" – Evan Craft
(writers) Abraham Osorio, Alex Sampedro, Evan Craft"Tus Cuerdas De Amor (featuring Lowsan Melgar)" – Julio Melgar(writer) Julio Melgar"Salmo 23 (featuring Marco Barrientos)" – Un Corazón
(writers) Lluvia Richards, Steven Daniel RichardsSpanish Album of the Year¿Quién contra nosotros? – Alex Zurdo(producer) Alex ZurdoTu Primero – Andy Alemany, (producers) Ivan Ruiz, Samuel Ash
Emanuel – Christine D'Clario
(producers) Carlos Caban, Christine D'Clario, José Olide, Paul Pineda
A Partir De Hoy – Rojo
(producers) Eliseo Tapia, Emmanuel Espinosa
Hola, Futuro – Un Corazón
(producer) Steven Richards

 Worship Worship Recorded Song of the Year"Raise a Hallelujah" – Bethel Music, Jonathan David Helser, Melissa Helser
(writers) Jake Stevens, Jonathan David Helser, Melissa Helser, Molly Skaggs
"Who You Say I Am (Studio Version)" – Hillsong Worship
(writers) Ben Fielding, Reuben Morgan
"Stand in Your Love" – Josh Baldwin
(writers) Ethan Hulse, Josh Baldwin, Mark Harris, Rita Springer
"Build My Life" – Pat Barrett
(writers) Brett Younker, Karl Martin, Kirby Kaple, Matt Redman, Pat Barrett"Living Hope" – Phil Wickham(writers) Brian Johnson, Phil WickhamWorship Album of the YearVictory – Bethel Music
(producer) Ed Cash
Holy Roar – Chris Tomlin
(producers) Bryan Fowler, Ed Cash
Hallelujah Here Below – Elevation Worship
(producer) Elevation WorshipPEOPLE – Hillsong UNITED(producers) Michael Guy Chislett, Joel HoustonLiving Hope – Phil Wickham
(producers) Ed Cash, Jonathan Smith, Nicolas Balachandran, Pete Kipley, Ran Jackson, Ricky Jackson

 Other categories Instrumental Album of the YearRise! – Ben Tankard
(producer) Ben Tankard
Front Porch Pickin': Old Time Gospel Favorites – Kevin Williams
(producer) Kevin WilliamsChristmas – Paul Cardall(producer) Jim DanekerChildren's Album of the YearBright Ones (Soundtrack) – Bright Ones(producers) Jacob Sooter, James Morales, Jeff Schneeweis, Mike "X" O' Connor, Rick Seibold, Seth MosleySing: Creation Songs – Ellie Holcomb
(producers) Ben Shive, Brown Bannister, Nathan Dugger
Lullaby – Michael W. Smith
(producers) Mike Nawrocki, Tyler Michael SmithChristmas / Special Event Album of the YearSomething's Happening! – Cece Winans
(producer) Alvin Love III
It Must Be Christmas – David Phelps
(producer) David Phelps
The Advent of Christmas – Matt Maher
(producers) Matt Maher, Mitch ParksMusical of the YearCome and See, Go and Tell
(creators) Lee Black, Jason Cox, (arranger & orchestrator) Marty Hamby
Jesus, Only King Forever
(creators) Jason Cox, Cliff Duren, Camp Kirkland, Phil Nitz
Take Me Back To Bethlehem
(creators) Sue C. Smith, Mason Brown, (arrangers) Mason Brown, Russell MauldinWelcome to Bethlehem(creators) Joel Lindsey, Jeff Bumgardner, Heidi Petak, (arranger & orchestrator) Daniel SemsenWhile the World Was Waiting(creators) Marty Funderburk, Mike Harland, Cliff Duren, Phillip Keveren, Phil Nitz

Youth / Children's Musical of the YearRandom Acts of Christmas(creators) Nick Robertson, Anna Lampe, Alisen WellsStraight Outta Bethlehem(creator) Christy Semsen, (arranger) Daniel SemsenThe Name of Jesus(creators) Dale Mathews, Dana Anderson

Choral Collection of the YearPrince of  Heaven(creator) Travis CottrellThe Great American Church Songbook(arranger & orchestrator) Cliff DurenThe Worship of Christmas(creators) Phil Barfoot, Bradley Knight

Recorded Music Packaging of the YearVictory – Bethel Music
(art director) Stephen James Hart, (graphic designer) Stephen James Hart, (photographers) Rachel Soh, Jordana GriffithThe Wait – David Leonard(art directors) David Leonard, Jason B. Jones, (graphic designer) Jordan Rubino, (photographer) Elliot EicheldingerHallelujah Here Below – Elevation Worship
(art directors) Ryan Hollingsworth, Jacob Boyles, (graphic designer) Jacob Boyles, (illustrator) Tyler Deeb, (photographers) Jacob Boyles, Steven Lester
God of the Impossible – Lincoln Brewster
(art director) Jason B. Jones, (graphic designer) Jordan Rubino, (photographer) Lee Steffen
Native Tongue – Switchfoot
(art director) Carrie Smith, (graphic designer) Jordan Wetherbee, Tommy Steele, (photographer) Erick Frost

 Videos and films Short Form Video of the YearAwakening – Amanda Lindsey Cook
(director) Josh Hesami, (producer) Joshua Mohline
Red Letters – Crowder
(director) Patrick Tohill, (producer) Patrick TohillHaven't Seen It Yet – Danny Gokey(director) Ry Cox, (producer) Joel HartzLet Go (Live at Hillsong Conference) – Hillsong Young & Free
(director) Nathaniel Redekop, (producers) Johnny Rays, Laura Toggs
Love Theory – Kirk Franklin
(director) Matt DeLisi, (producer) Ben SkipworthLong Form Video of the YearOnly Jesus Visual Album – Casting Crowns(director) Ashley Lollis, (producer) Kyle LollisHoly Roar: Live From Church – Chris Tomlin
(director) Steven Lester, (producer) Matt Reed
The Wait (Movie) – David Leonard
(director) Elliot Eicheldinger, (producers) The Creak Music, Integrity Music
People (LIVE) – Hillsong UNITED
(directors) Nathaniel Redekop, Richard Cause, (producers) Johnny Rays, Joel Houston
Survivor: Live From Harding Prison – Zach Williams
(director) Jace Freeman, (producer) Sean ClarkInspirational Film of the YearBreakthrough(director) Roxann Dawson, (producers) DeVon Franklin, Jessica DunnIndivisible(director) David G. Evans, (producers) Darren Moorman, David G. Evans, Esther EvansRun the Race(director) Chris Dowling, (producers) Darren Moorman, Jake McEntire, Ken CarpenterUnbroken: Path to Redemption(director) Harold Cronk, (producers) Matt Baer, Mike ElliotUnplanned''
(directors) Chuck Konzelman, Cary Solomon, (producers) Cary Solomon, Chris Jones, Chuck Konzelman, Daryl C. Lefever, Fabiano Altamura, Jason Stafford, Joe Knopp, Mark Cheatwood, Megan Harrington, Sheila Hart

References

External links 
 

2019 music awards
GMA Dove Awards
2019 in American music
2019 in Tennessee
GMA